Eclecticism is a conceptual approach that does not hold rigidly to a single paradigm or set of assumptions, but instead draws upon multiple theories, styles, or ideas to gain complementary insights into a subject, or applies different theories in particular cases. However, this is often without conventions or rules dictating how or which theories were combined.

It can sometimes seem inelegant or lacking in simplicity, and eclectics are sometimes criticized for lack of consistency in their thinking. It is, however, common in many fields of study. For example, most psychologists accept certain aspects of behaviorism, but do not attempt to use the theory to explain all aspects of human behavior.

Eclecticism in ethics, philosophy, politics and religion is also known as syncretism.

Origin
Eclecticism was first recorded to have been practiced by a group of ancient Greek and Roman philosophers who attached themselves to no real system, but selected from existing philosophical beliefs those doctrines that seemed most reasonable to them. Out of this collected material they constructed their new system of philosophy. Well known eclectics in Greek philosophy were the Stoics Panaetius and Posidonius, and the New Academics Carneades and Philo of Larissa. Among the Romans, Cicero was thoroughly eclectic, as he united the Peripatetic, Stoic, and New Academic doctrines. Philo's successor and Cicero's teacher Antiochus of Ascalon is credited with influencing the Academy so that it finally transitioned from Skepticism to Eclecticism. Other eclectics included Varro and Seneca the Younger.

According to Rošker and Suhadolnik, however, even though eclecticism had a Greek origin, the term was rarely used and it was even given a negative connotation by historians of Greek thought, associating it with the description for impure and unoriginal thinking. Scholars such as Clement of Alexandria maintained that eclecticism had a long history in Greek philosophy and it is underpinned by a deeper metaphysical and theological conviction concerning the absolute/God as the source of all noble thoughts and that all parts of the truth can be found among the various philosophical systems.

Usage

Architecture and art

The term eclecticism is used to describe the combination, in a single work, of elements from different historical styles, chiefly in architecture and, by implication, in the fine and decorative arts. The term is sometimes also loosely applied to the general stylistic variety of 19th-century architecture after neoclassicism, although the revivals of styles in that period have, since the 1970s, generally been referred to as aspects of historicism.

Eclecticism plays an important role in critical discussions and evaluations but is somehow distant from the actual forms of the artifacts to which it is applied, and its meaning is thus rather indistinct. The simplest definition of the term—that every work of art represents the combination of a variety of influences—is so basic as to be of little use. In some ways Eclecticism is reminiscent of Mannerism in that the term was used pejoratively for much of the period of its currency, although, unlike Mannerism, Eclecticism never amounted to a movement or constituted a specific style: it is characterized precisely by the fact that it was not a particular style.

Martial arts

Some martial arts can be described as eclectic in the sense that they borrow techniques from a wide variety of other martial arts.

Philology
In textual criticism, eclecticism is the practice of examining a wide number of text witnesses and selecting the variant that seems best. The result of the process is a text with readings drawn from many witnesses. In a purely eclectic approach, no single witness is theoretically favored. Instead, the critic forms opinions about individual witnesses, relying on both external and internal evidence.

Since the mid-19th century, eclecticism, in which there is no a priori bias to a single manuscript, has been the dominant method of editing the Greek text of the New Testament (currently, the United Bible Society, 4th ed. and Nestle-Åland, 27th ed.). Even so, the oldest manuscripts, being of the Alexandrian text-type, are the most favored, and the critical text has an Alexandrian disposition.

Philosophy
In Hellenistic philosophy, the Eclectics used elements from multiple philosophies, texts, life experiences, and their own philosophical ideas. These ideas include life as connected with existence, knowledge, values, reason, mind, and language. This movement is closely associated with Middle Platonism.

Antiochus of Ascalon was the pupil of Philo of Larissa, and the teacher of Cicero. Through his influence, Platonism transitioned from the Academic Skepticism of the New Academy to Eclecticism. Whereas Philo had adhered to the doctrine that there is nothing absolutely certain, Antiochus abandoned this to support dogmatism. Among his objections to skepticism was the consideration that without firm convictions no rational content of life is possible. Antiochus pointed out that it is a contradiction to assert that nothing can be asserted or to prove that nothing can be proved; that we cannot speak of false ideas and at the same time deny the distinction between false and true. He expounded the Academic, Peripatetic, and Stoic systems in such a way as to show that these three schools deviated from one another only in minor points. Antiochus was chiefly interested in ethics, in which he tried to find a middle way between Zeno of Citium, Aristotle, and Plato. For instance, he said that virtue suffices for eudaimonia, but for the highest grade of happiness, bodily and external goods are necessary as well.

This eclectic tendency was enabled by the fact that most of Plato's works were non-dogmatic. Middle Platonism was promoted by the necessity of considering the main theories of the post-Platonic schools of philosophy, such as the Aristotelian logic and the Stoic psychology and ethics (theory of goods and emotions). On the one hand the Middle Platonists were engaged like the later Peripatetics in scholarly activities such as the exposition of Plato's doctrines and the explanation of his dialogues; on the other hand they attempted to develop the Platonic theories systematically. In so far as it was subject in this to the influence of Neopythagoreanism, it was of considerable importance in preparing the way for Neoplatonism.

In modern philosophy, Victor Cousin was the founder of  modern Eclecticism.

Psychology

Eclecticism is recognized in approaches to psychology that see many factors influencing behavior and cognition or psyche. In the 1970s, psychologists started using whichever approaches and techniques that they deemed appropriate for their client. They take multiple perspectives into consideration while identifying, explaining, and changing the behavior of the client.

See also
 Eclectic medicine
 Eclecticism in architecture
 Eclecticism in art
 Eclecticism in music
 Eclecticism in textual criticism
 Pastiche
 Perspectivism
 Polystylism

References

External links

Metatheory
 
Philosophical schools and traditions